Salem is an independent city in the U.S. commonwealth of Virginia. As of the 2020 census, the population was 25,346. It is the county seat of Roanoke County, although the two are separate jurisdictions. The Bureau of Economic Analysis combines the city of Salem with Roanoke County, which surrounds both Salem and the neighboring City of Roanoke, for statistical purposes. Salem has its own courthouse and sheriff's office, but shares a jail with Roanoke County, which is located in the Roanoke County Courthouse complex in Salem.  The Roanoke County Sheriff's Office and Roanoke County Department of Social Services are also located within Salem, though the county administrative offices are located in unincorporated Cave Spring.

Roanoke College is located in the city. Salem is also the home to a minor league baseball team, the Salem Red Sox.

History 
The earliest history of Salem exists as archaeological evidence of Native American tribes from as far back as 8000 B.C. until the middle of the 18th century. Europeans first explored the area of Salem in 1671, when the Siouan-speaking Totero people had a village nearby. Explorers Thomas Batts and Robert Fallam gave the area its first recorded name: Totero Town, after this tribe, who supplied them with a guide to help with further exploration. Fort Lewis, named for General Andrew Lewis, of what is now Roanoke County, was built west of the town in 1752. Salem's Andrew Lewis Middle School (formerly Andrew Lewis High School) was named after General Lewis. Salem became a small settlement serving travelers on the Great Road (roughly the same path followed by US-11 and later Interstate 81 today) and was officially founded in 1802, receiving its charter in 1806.  It is not known why the town was named Salem; the most widely accepted explanation is that it was named to honor William Bryan, a prominent citizen, who had moved from Salem, New Jersey.

Salem was attacked twice by the Union Army during the American Civil War, but its Salem Flying Artillery is said to have fired the last Confederate shot at Appomattox Court House prior to Robert E. Lee's surrender.

One of the city's four elementary schools is named after African American scientist G. W. Carver. Before integration, this was the high school for African Americans in Salem.

Salem annexed South Salem in 1953 and also an eastern tract in 1960, giving it a population of 16,058 – making it Virginia's largest town at the time. Salem officially became a city on December 31, 1967, to avoid the possibility of annexation into the city of Roanoke. Per the Virginia constitution, it was separated from Roanoke County. However, it remains the official county seat, although the Roanoke County Administrative Building is located in the Cave Spring area of the county.

Salem has been the home of two colleges. In 1847, the Virginia Institute, a boy's preparatory school, moved to Salem from Staunton. It received a college charter in 1853 and was renamed Roanoke College for the Roanoke Valley. The college is located in central Salem, one block north of Main Street. Roanoke Women's College, later named Elizabeth College, operated between 1912 and 1922. The college burned in late 1921 and did not reopen. Like Roanoke College, it was affiliated with the Evangelical Lutheran Church in America. The Elizabeth College campus is now the site of residence halls and athletic fields that belong to Roanoke College.

Salem is home to the Salem Red Sox, a Class-A affiliate to the Boston Red Sox. The Amos Alonzo Stagg Bowl, the NCAA Division III Football Championship game was held at Salem Football Stadium between 1993 and 2016. Salem's success in holding that event led the NCAA to also move the NCAA Men's Division III Basketball Championship and the NCAA Division III Volleyball Championship to the Salem Civic Center and the Women's NCAA Division III Softball Championship to Moyer Field. In August 2007, the Salem Football Stadium also hosted the Southwestern Virginia Educational Classic. This game is played annually in the Roanoke Valley and consists of two football teams from Historically Black Colleges and Universities.  The city hosts several other statewide, regional, and national sporting events at its facilities.  These events are attracted by the city's hospitality, modern facilities and overall support.  Salem High School, is also known for its athletic programs, particularly the football team which has won ten state championships since 1996, and also the forensics team, which has won fourteen consecutive state championships.

Geography
Salem is located at  (37.286895, -80.055836).

Demographics

2020 census

Note: the US Census treats Hispanic/Latino as an ethnic category. This table excludes Latinos from the racial categories and assigns them to a separate category. Hispanics/Latinos can be of any race.

2000 Census
As of the census of 2000, there were 24,747 people, 9,954 households, and 6,539 families residing in the city. The population density was 1,696.4 people per square mile (654.9/km2). There were 10,403 housing units at an average density of 713.1 per square mile (275.3/km2). The racial makeup of the city was 91.88% White, 5.88% African American, 0.13% Native American, 0.97% Asian, 0.02% Pacific Islander, 0.25% from other races, and 0.86% from two or more races. Hispanic or Latino of any race were 0.83% of the population.

There were 9,954 households, out of which 28.2% had children under the age of 18 living with them, 50.9% were married couples living together, 11.5% had a female householder with no husband present, and 34.3% were non-families. 29.0% of all households were made up of individuals, and 12.2% had someone living alone who was 65 years of age or older. The average household size was 2.32 and the average family size was 2.84.

In the city, the population was spread out, with 20.9% under the age of 18, 11.7% from 18 to 24, 26.7% from 25 to 44, 24.0% from 45 to 64, and 16.8% who were 65 years of age or older. The median age was 39 years. For every 100 females, there were 89.3 males. For every 100 females age 18 and over, there were 85.5 males.

The median income for a household in the city was $38,997, and the median income for a family was $47,174. Males had a median income of $32,472 versus $23,193 for females. The per capita income for the city was $20,091. About 4.3% of families and 6.7% of the population were below the poverty line, including 7.0% of those under age 18 and 8.1% of those age 65 or over.

Government 
Salem is governed by a five-member council. The council elects a Mayor and Vice Mayor from within itself. The members of council are Mayor Renée Ferris Turk, Vice Mayor James “Jim” Wallace III, Byron “Randy” Foley, William “Bill” Jones, and John Saunders. 

Day-to-day operations are run by the City Manager, James “Jay” Taliaferro.

Notable people

Dennis Haley, former NFL Linebacker for the Baltimore Ravens, New York Jets, and San Francisco 49ers.
John McAfee, computer programmer and businessman.
Marcus Parker, former Virginia Tech and NFL, Cincinnati Bengals running back.
Ruth Painter Randall, biographer
Billy Sample, former Major League baseball outfielder for the Texas Rangers, New York Yankees and Atlanta Braves; broadcaster and writer
David C. Shanks, US Army major general
Leander J. Shaw, Jr., Chief Justice of the Florida Supreme Court, was born in Salem.
Adam Ward, photojournalist killed on live television while reporting for WDBJ7.

See also
National Register of Historic Places listings in Salem, Virginia

References

External links

Roanoke College
 Community history

 
Populated places established in 1802
County seats in Virginia
1802 establishments in Virginia
Cities in Virginia